Borden may refer to:

Places

Australia 
Borden, Western Australia

Canada 
Borden, Saskatchewan
Borden, Ontario, a Canadian Forces base located in Ontario
Borden-Carleton, Prince Edward Island, formerly the town of Borden
Borden Peninsula, Nunavut, Canada
Borden Island, Nunavut, Canada
Canadian Forces Base Borden (also known as "CFB Borden" and "16 Wing Borden"), a Canadian Forces base located in Ontario

United Kingdom 
Borden, Kent, England
Bordon, Hampshire, England
Bordon and Longmoor Military Camps, British Army training camps and training area
Borden, West Sussex, England

United States 
Borden, California
Borden, Indiana
Borden, Texas
Borden County, Texas
Borden Lake, a lake in Minnesota
Borden Shaft, Maryland
Borden Ranch AVA, California wine region

People 
Borden (surname)
Borden Chase (1900–1971), American writer
Borden Smith (born 1943), Canadian professional hockey player

Other uses
Borden (company), a defunct American dairy company that was the forerunner of Borden, Inc.
Borden Milk Products, a privately held dairy company